Takifugu oblongus, known as the oblong blowfish or lattice blaasop, is a species of pufferfish in the family Tetraodontidae. It is native to the Indo-Pacific, where it ranges from South Africa to Indonesia, Japan, and Australia. It lives primarily in coastal marine environments, although it is known to enter brackish water. The species reaches 40 cm (15.8 inches) SL.

References 

oblongus
Fish described in 1786